Paul H. Lewis is professor emeritus and former Chair of Political Science at Tulane University. Lewis received his BA from the University of Florida and PhD from UNC Chapel Hill. In 1991, he helped organize the Louisiana chapter of the National Association of Scholars.

The books he wrote include:
The Politics of Exile (1968 Paraguay under Stroessner (1980)Socialism, Liberalism, and Dictatorship in Paraguay (1982)The Crisis of Argentine Capitalism (1990)Latin Fascist Elites, The Mussolini, Franco and Salazar Regimes (2003);Guerrillas and Generals The Agony of Argentine Capitalism: From Menem to the Kirchners Authoritarian Regimes in Latin America: Dictators, Despots, and Tyrants''.

References 

Tulane University faculty
Living people
American political scientists
Year of birth missing (living people)